Baas-o-Beyt is a special kind of rhyming game common among Sistanian people and is generally considered as a genre of Sistanian poetry (called Seytak) played by composing verses of Sistanian poems, along with some Sistanian dance and music. It is very similar to Bait bazi, Antakshari and Crambo as well.

Etymology 
The term Baas-o-Beyt drives from Arabic Bahs and Beyt meaning debate and two line poetry, respectively.

Example
The first one starts the Baas-o-Beyt like this:

Rasido var sare rude Adimi
Salāmo ale'ko e' yāre ghadimi!
Bgofto dokhtarak bose' va me de
maga kuri ke bābāyom nadidi?

(I just got to the river Adimi, 
Salutation to you, my old friend!
I said to her: Just give me a kiss, girl.
{and she answered} Can't you see my father {right around us}, you blind man?)

The next one answers like this:

Byāya bogzara mesle ame'sha
Aga yag bose me'dādi che me'sha?
Aga yag bose me'dādi va āshegh
Va fardāye qiāmat kam name'sha.

({Your father} is going to pass by us, like all the {other} times.
Why don't you give me a kiss?
Give a kiss to your lover
Do not be scared of anything.)

See also
 Bibi Seshanbe

References 

Persian poetry
Sistani culture
Iranian games
Word games
Games of mental skill
Multiplayer games